The Early Bird is a 1965 British comedy film directed by Robert Asher and starring Norman Wisdom. It also features Edward Chapman, Bryan Pringle, Richard Vernon, John Le Mesurier and Jerry Desmonde. It was the first Norman Wisdom film to be shot in colour. The title is taken from the expression "the early bird catches the worm".

Synopsis
Wisdom's character works for Grimsdale's Dairy as a milkman, in competition with Consolidated Dairies, an ever-growing rival company under the management of Walter Hunter (played by Jerry Desmonde).

Much of the humour centres on classic slapstick comedy, with Norman encountering various comedic escapades. These include being dragged around Mr Hunter's garden by an errant lawnmower and using the fire brigade's high pressure hosepipes to blast firemen off their ladders, after being called to a suspected fire at Consolidated Dairies' HQ.

Cast
 Norman Wisdom as Norman Pitkin
 Edward Chapman as Mr Thomas Grimsdale
 Jerry Desmonde as Mr Walter Hunter
 Paddie O'Neil as Mrs Gladwys Hoskins
 Bryan Pringle as Austin
 Richard Vernon as Sir Roger Wedgewood
 John Le Mesurier as Colonel Foster
 Peter Jeffrey as Fire Chief
 Penny Morrell as Miss Curry
 Marjie Lawrence as Woman in negligee
 Frank Thornton as Drunken doctor
 Dandy Nichols as Woman flooded by milk
 Harry Locke as Commissionaire
 Michael Bilton as Nervous Man
 Imogen Hassall as Sir Roger's Secretary
 Tony Selby as Godfrey (uncredited)

Reception
The film was one of the 15 most popular movies at the British box office in 1966.
TV Guide wrote, "most of the humor is slapstick, predictable, and only vaguely amusing";  while Allmovie called the film a "lively British satire".

References

External links
 
 
 
 The Early Bird at MTV

1965 films
1965 comedy films
1960s English-language films
British comedy films
Films shot at Pinewood Studios
Films directed by Robert Asher
Fictional milkmen
Films scored by Ron Goodwin
1960s British films